Ricardo Chandeck (born 20 January 1973) is a Panamanian sports shooter. He competed in the men's 10 metre air pistol event at the 2000 Summer Olympics.

References

1973 births
Living people
Panamanian male sport shooters
Olympic shooters of Panama
Shooters at the 2000 Summer Olympics
Place of birth missing (living people)